Brittany Waters (born April 23, 1983) is a Canadian rugby union player. She represented  at the 2010 Women's Rugby World Cup and the 2014 Women's Rugby World Cup.

Waters attended the University of Victoria for her undergrad, attaining a Bachelor of Arts degree. She then went on to receive her Master of Occupational Therapy degree from the University of British Columbia.

Brittany is the current head coach of the UVic Women's Rugby Program.

References

1983 births
Living people
Sportspeople from Vancouver
Canadian female rugby union players
Canada women's international rugby union players
Female rugby union players
Canada international women's rugby sevens players